The action off Galveston Light was a short naval battle fought during the American Civil War in January 1863.

Background
The steamer had a crew of 126 officers and men and was armed with four 32-pounders and one 20-pounder naval gun. Captain Raphael Semmes commanded the 1,050-ton sloop-of-war CSS Alabama which carried 145 officers and men with six 32-pounders, one 110-pounder and one 68-pounder gun. The encounter between the two vessels was the first combat action of Alabamas distinguished career.

Action
Captain Blake was then ordered to chase the unidentified ship in Hatteras and to capture the vessel if it proved to be an enemy. The ship was Alabama and she could not escape. After pursuing Alabama until nightfall just over twenty miles of sea from Galveston Harbor to a position off Galveston Light, Hatteras came alongside of the Confederate ship and demanded that the crew identify themselves. The Confederates called out  to try to confuse the Union sailors so Captain Blake ordered a boat to be filled with sailors and lowered for a boarding. But just as the launch shoved off the Confederates shouted "We're the CSS Alabama", raised their colors, and opened fire with a heavy broadside on the portside of the Union vessel. 

The men aboard Hatteras were surprised but returned fire with their much smaller broadside. For thirteen minutes the two sides dueled in what Captain Semmes later called a "sharp and exiting" engagement. In the end, crewmen aboard USS Hatteras fired a signal gun to announce their defeat, Hatteras was slowly sinking and Captain Blake ordered the magazines flooded to prevent an explosion. Men began jumping into the water and boats from Alabama were lowered to provide assistance. At the same time a boat with six Union sailors escaped along the coast and evaded the Confederates who were maneuvering to rescue survivors. Two United States Navy enlisted men were killed in action, five were wounded and another 118 taken prisoner. CSS Alabama sustained several shot holes and other damage but Captain Semmes reported that none of it was serious and prevented the vessel from sailing. Two Confederate Navy sailors were wounded.

Aftermath
After sinking the Union steamer the Confederates sailed for the South Atlantic, they were chased unsuccessfully by some of the Galveston blockaders but no further fighting occurred. Her colors were not struck in the battle and were still waving in the breeze when Brooklyn arrived.

See also

 Bahia Incident
 Single ship action
 Sinking of Petrel

References

History of Galveston, Texas
Naval battles of the American Civil War
Confederate victories of the American Civil War
Maritime incidents in January 1863
Battles of the American Civil War in Texas